= Vilenica, Travnik =

Vilenica
- Village
- Location within Bosnia and Herzegovina
- Coordinates: 44.209564°N 17.6579597°E
- Country: Bosnia and Herzegovina
- Entity: Federation of Bosnia and Herzegovina
- Canton: Central Bosnia
- Municipality: Travnik

Area
  - Total: 1.20 sq mi (3.10 km^{2})

Population (2013)
  - Total: 19
  - Density: 16/sq mi (6.1/km^{2})
- Time zone: UTC+1 (CET)
  - Summer (DST): UTC+2 (CEST)

Vilenica is a village in the municipality of Travnik, Bosnia and Herzegovina.

== Demographics ==
According to the 2013 census, its population was 19.

Ethnicity in 2013
Ethnicity	Number	Percentage
Bosniaks	15	78.9%
Croats	4	21.1%
Total	19	100%
